Nikita Nagaev (born 27 September 1993) is a Russian wheelchair fencer. He won the bronze medal in the men's foil A event at the 2020 Summer Paralympics held in Tokyo, Japan. He competed at the Summer Paralympics under the flag of the Russian Paralympic Committee.

References 

Living people
1993 births
Sportspeople from Ufa
Russian male fencers
Wheelchair fencers at the 2020 Summer Paralympics
Medalists at the 2020 Summer Paralympics
Paralympic bronze medalists for the Russian Paralympic Committee athletes
Paralympic medalists in wheelchair fencing
Paralympic wheelchair fencers of Russia
21st-century Russian people